"A Little More Work" is a song recorded by Canadian country music artist Kira Isabella. It was released July 31, 2012 as the third single from her debut studio album Love Me Like That (2012). Peaking at number 68 on the Billboard Canadian Hot 100 and number 5 on the Canada Country airplay chart, it is, as of March 2018, Isabella's most commercially successful single. A "radio mix" of the song was released October 21, 2014 as Isabella's second American single, following "Quarterback".

Composition
"A Little More Work" is a country song additionally influenced by pop and rock music with a duration of three minutes and fifteen seconds. MusicRow also described the song's sound as "bluesy". It was written by Kira Isabella, Jason Phelps, and Walt Aldridge, and was produced by Jerry Lane and Mark Liggett. The song is instrumented by distorted guitars and features empowering lyrics about a girl who refuses to give up her heart easily, insisting her love interest has "a little more work" to do to keep her satisfied. Isabella's "good girl who brashly goes her own way" attitude on the song has been favorably compared to Taylor Swift by Wondering Sound magazine.

Music video
The music video was directed by Ben Knechtel and premiered August 17, 2012.

Awards and nominations
The video for "A Little More Work" was nominated for the CMT Video of the Year award at the 2013 Canadian Country Music Association Awards, but lost to Gord Bamford's "Leaning on a Lonesome Song".

Chart performance
"A Little More Work" debuted at number 93 on the Canadian Hot 100 for the week of September 8, 2012.

Release history

References

2012 singles
Kira Isabella songs
Songs written by Walt Aldridge
2012 songs